Ediglê Quaresma Farias (born 13 May 1978 in Fortaleza), simply known as Ediglê, is a Brazilian footballer who plays for São Raimundo as a central defender.

Ediglê has previously played for Internacional in the Campeonato Brasileiro. He also spent one season in the Primeira Liga playing for Marítimo.

Honours
 Internacional
 Copa Libertadores: 2006
 FIFA Club World Cup: 2006

 Esportivo
 Campeonato Gaúcho Série B: 2012

 Fast Clube
 Campeonato Amazonense: 2016

 Manaus
 Campeonato Amazonense: 2017

References

1978 births
Living people
Sportspeople from Fortaleza
Brazilian footballers
Association football defenders
Brazilian expatriate footballers
Brazilian expatriate sportspeople in Portugal
Expatriate footballers in Portugal
Campeonato Brasileiro Série A players
Campeonato Brasileiro Série B players
Campeonato Brasileiro Série C players
Campeonato Brasileiro Série D players
Primeira Liga players
Ferroviário Atlético Clube (CE) players
Nacional Futebol Clube players
Ceará Sporting Club players
Atlético Rio Negro Clube players
São Raimundo Esporte Clube footballers
Clube 15 de Novembro players
Sport Club Internacional players
C.S. Marítimo players
Associação Portuguesa de Desportos players
Clube Náutico Capibaribe players
Clube Atlético Linense players
Clube Esportivo Bento Gonçalves players
Esporte Clube Passo Fundo players
Nacional Fast Clube players